Braggs is an unincorporated community in Lowndes County, Alabama, United States.

History
Braggs was named for Peter Braggs, who served as the first postmaster. Bragg served as a soldier during the American Revolutionary War.

A post office operated under the name Braggs from 1833 to 1959 and under the name Braggs Rural Station from 1959 to 1972.

Geology
Portions of a mosasaur have been discovered in Braggs.

A Cretaceous–Paleogene boundary site is located near Braggs.

References

Unincorporated communities in Lowndes County, Alabama
Unincorporated communities in Alabama